Gianluca Scamacca (born 1 January 1999) is an Italian professional footballer who plays as a striker for  club West Ham United and the Italy national team.

Scamacca previously played for Jong PSV and Sassuolo, with loans at Cremonese, PEC Zwolle, Ascoli and Genoa. He made his senior international debut for Italy in 2021.

Club career

Early career
A product of Roma youth academy, Scamacca joined PSV Eindhoven in January 2015. He made his professional debut in Eerste Divisie as a Jong PSV player on 22 January 2016, aged 17, in a 2–1 away win against VVV-Venlo, replacing Steven Bergwijn after 61 minutes.

Sassuolo
In January 2017, he was signed by Italian club Sassuolo on a four-and-a-half-year deal. On 29 October, at age 18, he made his Serie A debut in a 3–1 loss against Napoli at the Stadio San Paolo, coming on as a substitute for Diego Falcinelli in the 85th minute.

Loans to Cremonese, PEC Zwolle, Ascoli and Genoa
In January 2018, Scamacca joined Serie B club Cremonese on loan. He scored his first professional goal on 14 April 2018, in the league match against Palermo.

On 31 August 2018, Scamacca joined Eredivisie club PEC Zwolle on loan. He made his debut on 2 September 2018 in the away league match won 1–0 against Groningen.

On 13 July 2019, he joined Serie B club Ascoli on loan.

On 2 October 2020, Scamacca joined Genoa in the Serie A on a season-long loan.

Return to Sassuolo 
In summer 2021, Scamacca returned to Sassuolo, coached by Alessio Dionisi.  On 17 October, he scored his first goals with the neroverdi, scoring a brace in an away game against his former team, Genoa, helping his side draw 2–2. During the 2021–22 season, he played as a starter alongside Domenico Berardi and Giacomo Raspadori in attack, and ended the season with 16 league goals. He made his last appearance to the club on 22 May 2022 in a 3-0 loss to AC Milan.

West Ham United 
On 26 July 2022, Scamacca signed for Premier League club West Ham United on a five-year contract with an option for a further year. The transfer fee paid to Sassuolo was reportedly of £30.5 million, with an additional £5 million in add-ons. A 10% sell-on clause for the Italian team was also reportedly included in the deal.

Scamacca made his West Ham and Premier League debut coming on as a second-half substitute for Michail Antonio in a 2–0 home defeat to Manchester City on 7 August 2022. His first goal for West Ham came in his third game, on 18 August, in the play-off round of the UEFA Conference League against Viborg; he scored the first goal of an eventual 3–1 win. He scored his first league goal for the club in a 2-0 home win over Wolverhampton Wanderers on 1 October 2022.

International career

Youth 
As a member of the Italy U17 side, Scamacca took part at the 2015 and 2016 editions of the UEFA European Under-17 Championship.

With Italy U19, Scamacca took part in the 2018 UEFA European Under-19 Championship, and scored two goals in the tournament, including one in the 4–3 final loss against Portugal after extra time. The following year he took part in the 2019 FIFA U-20 World Cup with the Italy U20 squad, reaching the fourth place.

On 25 May 2018, Scamacca made his debut with the Italy U21 team in a friendly match lost 3–2 against Portugal. He scored his first goal with the Italy U21 team on 6 September 2019, in a friendly match won 4–0 against Moldova. He took part in the 2021 UEFA European Under-21 Championship, where he scored two goals.

Senior 
He received his first call up to the senior Italy squad for the team's 2022 FIFA World Cup qualifiers in September 2021. He made his senior debut on 8 September, in a 5–0 home win over Lithuania, coming on as a second–half substitute for Federico Bernardeschi.

Career statistics

Club

International

Honours
Italy U19
UEFA European Under-19 Championship runner-up: 2018

Italy U20
FIFA U-20 World Cup fourth place: 2019

Individual
Coppa Italia top goalscorer: 2019–20 (shared), 2020–21

References

External links
 Gianluca Scamacca at West Ham United F.C.
 
 
 

1999 births
Living people
Footballers from Rome
Association football forwards
Italian footballers
PSV Eindhoven players
U.S. Sassuolo Calcio players
U.S. Cremonese players
PEC Zwolle players
Ascoli Calcio 1898 F.C. players
Genoa C.F.C. players
West Ham United F.C. players
Serie A players
Serie B players
Eredivisie players
Eerste Divisie players
Premier League players
Italy youth international footballers
Italy under-21 international footballers
Italy international footballers
Italian expatriate footballers
Expatriate footballers in the Netherlands
Italian expatriate sportspeople in the Netherlands
Expatriate footballers in England
Italian expatriate sportspeople in England